Baron Stalbridge, of Stalbridge in the County of Dorset, was a title in the Peerage of the United Kingdom. It was created on 22 March 1886 for the politician and businessman Lord Richard Grosvenor. He was the third son of Richard Grosvenor, 2nd Marquess of Westminster (see Duke of Westminster for earlier history of the family). On the death of Lord Stalbridge's eldest son, the second Baron, on 24 December 1949, the barony became extinct.

Barons Stalbridge (1886)
Richard de Aquila Grosvenor, 1st Baron Stalbridge (1837–1912)
Hugh Grosvenor, 2nd Baron Stalbridge (1880–1949)

See also
Duke of Westminster
Earl of Wilton
Baron Ebury

References

Extinct baronies in the Peerage of the United Kingdom
Noble titles created in 1886
Noble titles created for UK MPs